Generał broni (literally General of arms, general of the branch, abbreviated gen. broni) is the second highest Generals grade in the Polish Army, second only to the recently introduced rank of Generał (both in Land Forces and in the Polish Air Force). Depending on the context, it is equivalent to the modern grade of Lieutenant General or (especially in French-speaking countries) Corps General (French: Général de corps d'armée). 

The symbols of the rank are the general's wavy line and three stars, featured both on the rogatywka, sleeves of the uniform and above the breast pocket of a field uniform. 

Military ranks of Poland
Polish generals